HR 5110, also known as BH Canum Venaticorum, is a binary star system in the northern constellation of Canes Venatici. It is visible to the naked eye with an apparent visual magnitude of 4.91. The system is moving further from the Sun with a heliocentric radial velocity of 6.4 km/s.

This is a close binary system with an orbital period of 2.6 days and an orbital plane that is oriented nearly face-on. It may be considered an Algol-type semidetached binary. The hotter primary component has a stellar classification of F2 IV, indicating it is an evolving subgiant star that is leaving the main sequence after consuming the hydrogen at its core.

HR 5110 is classified as a RS Canum Venaticorum variable system, primarily due to chromospheric activity in the secondary component. This star has a classification of K0 IV, matching a K-type subgiant star. Based upon the close separation of the pair and the class of the secondary component, that latter is probably filling its roche lobe. This star is most likely the source of the radio emission from this system, and the alignment of this signal is consistent with a polar starspot.

References

Am stars
F-type subgiants
K-type subgiants
RS Canum Venaticorum variables
Spectroscopic binaries
Canes Venatici
Durchmusterung objects
118216
066257
5110
Canum Venaticorum, BH